On November 7, 2006, New York, along with the rest of the country held elections for the United States House of Representatives. Democrats picked up 3 House seats, the 19th, the 20th, and the 24th.

In federal elections, the Empire State has consistently handed its vote to Democratic candidates. Of New York's twenty-nine congressional districts, all but ten are centered on heavily liberal and Democratic New York City and its surrounding suburbs, including Long Island and Westchester County. In addition, Democrats were also predicting easy victories in the double digits for its gubernatorial candidate, New York State Attorney General Eliot Spitzer, and Senator Hillary Clinton. In 2002, a reapportionment was conducted and was planned as what is described as "a bipartisan incumbent protection plan". Many of the Republican-held districts were won by George W. Bush in the 2000 election while he lost statewide by a 25% margin. The primary was held on September 12, 2006. On September 11, the New York Times reported that Democrats were becoming less optimistic they could win Republican held House seats in New York this year. However, this turned out not to be the case as three districts elected Democrats over their Republican challengers, two of them incumbents. Projections regarding the senate and gubernatorial races were correct: Clinton held on to her place in the Senate with her nearest competitor trailing by more than half, and Spitzer was elected governor.

Delegation Composition

Results

3rd District

Incumbent Peter King (R) was elected for his sixth term by a healthy margin in 2004, 63% to 37%, but King is the only Republican congressman left on Long Island, where Republicans once were the majority party. Although King has broken with his party on a few key issues, he is potentially vulnerable in a district that is increasingly moderate to liberal. Nassau County Legislator Dave Mejias announced his candidacy on May 25  and was King's strongest opponent in years. An October 26 Majority-Watch poll had King leading Mejias 51% to 44% . CQPolitics rating: Republican Favored. Results: King was re-elected to another term in the House, garnering 56% of the vote.

11th District

Incumbent Major Owens (D) retired after 12 terms. In 2004 Owens was reelected with 94% of the vote in this majority African-American district in the center of Brooklyn. The Democratic primary was won by New York City Councilwoman Yvette Clarke. Little-known Republican physician Steve Finger was also running for the open seat. CQPolitics rating: Safe Democratic. Results: Yvette Clarke was a strong winner with 89% of the vote.

13th District

Since easily winning a special election in 1997, Fossella had long been reelected without trouble in this district which is based in Staten Island and the southwest section of Brooklyn. At the time Fossella was the only Republican in New York City's Congressional delegation.

However, in 2004 Fossella's share of the vote dropped dramatically against septuagenarian former judge, assemblyman and mayoral candidate Frank J. Barbaro, who achieved 41 percent of the vote. Attorney and former Brooklyn Community Board 10 Chairman, Steve Harrison, the 2006 Democratic candidate, improved on Barbaro's results receiving 43 percent of the vote.

Results: Fossella won with 57% of the vote.

19th District

Incumbent Sue Kelly (R) had rarely faced stiff competition since her initial election in 1994, but the Democratic primary attracted six contenders in 2006, two of whom dropped out before the primary. Former Ulster County Legislator John Hall, who was once a member of the popular rock band, Orleans, won the Democratic nomination with 49% of the vote in a multi-candidate primary. An October 26 Majority-Watch poll had him leading 49% to 47% . Several factors played into Kelly's defeat, including the  extremely weak GOP showing in the senatorial and gubernatorial races, her reluctance to answer questions about the Mark Foley Page Scandal, and Hall's quirky campaign style, which included an appearance on the satirical Comedy Central program The Colbert Report.  Following Hall's election, Stephen Colbert took credit for the victory and attributed it entirely to Hall's appearance on the show. Hall appeared several days later to satirically thank the host for his seat in Congress.  'Results:: Hall won with 51% of the vote.

20th District

Incumbent John E. Sweeney was the nominee for the Republican Party, while attorney Kirsten Gillibrand was the nominee for the Democratic Party. Gillibrand defeated Sweeney with 53% of the vote.

Another candidate, Morris Guller, attempted to run in the general election on the Liberal Party line and also tried to contest Kirsten Gillibrand in the September Democratic primary, but did not file petitions for either nomination.  Eric Sundwall filed petitions to run as the Libertarian candidate but was removed from the ballot when his petitions were ruled inadequate.

Republican
Incumbent John Sweeney' was running for re-election, although a newspaper reported in March 2006 that "Speculation has mounted over the past week regarding U.S. Rep. John Sweeney's future. Rumors are flying that the Clifton Park Republican might not seek re-election this fall. Between his health, his son's guilty plea to assault charges, a serious Democratic challenger, the DOJ pulling his financial filings and the Congressional Winter Challenge uproar, Sweeney is under a lot of stress and has been for a while".

No Republican filed to challenge Sweeney, although there was speculation earlier in 2006 that Alexander Treadwell of Lake Placid, Essex County, a Republican political leader and an ally of Governor George E. Pataki, would do so.  State Senator Elizabeth Little of Queensbury, Warren County, had also been mentioned as a possible Republican contender should Sweeney not run.

Over 40% of Sweeney's funding in this election cycle was from political action committees (PACs).

Democratic
The Democratic nominee was Kirsten Gillibrand, a native of Albany, who lives in Hudson.  She had faced a primary challenge from three other Democratic candidates (computer engineer Edwin Pell, retired probation officer Douglas Walters, and activist Morris Guller), but all three dropped out of the race prior to the filing deadline.

Gillibrand supports middle class tax cuts and has a proposal to let middle-class parents deduct up to $10,000 a year in college tuition. She supports changes to the GI Bill.  Gillibrand's has proposed, as a short-term solution for high gasoline prices, eliminating the federal tax on gas, with lost revenue from the tax being recouped by ending subsidies for oil companies. She has issued an ethics proposal which includes an "Ethics IOU" to the voters.

In the fundraising quarter ending June 30, 2006, her campaign raised more money than did Sweeney's.

Other parties

Libertarian Party
Eric Sundwall was the endorsed candidate of the Libertarian Party. He was a partner and co-founder of Old Kinderhook Integrated, a computer consulting company.

Sundwall received a degree in Political Science and History from the State University of New York at Albany. He studied in Copenhagen and worked with a for-profit law school, Concord.  He currently serves on the New York and national Libertarian Party committees.

As a third party candidate, Sundwall hoped to raise awareness about ballot access rights. Sundwall called on Congress to "declare war" according to the U.S. Constitution when invading any nation.

Sundwall's petitions were challenged on August 28 by three individuals with no obvious connection to the race.

The Board of Elections determination held that Sundwall was 690 signatures short of the 3500 required by New York State election law.  Sundwall's campaign challenged the New York Board of Elections in Federal District Court on October 10, 2006. Sundwall et al. v. Kelleher et al., sought a Temporary Restraining Order on the distribution of the NYS ballot claiming the 'town' requirement in the Independent designating petition as unconstitutional. Sundwall's complaint was denied by Judge Thomas Kahn.

Liberal Party
Morris N. Guller, a political activist and retired stockbroker from Greene County was endorsed by the New York State Liberal Party and attempted to challenge Gillibrand, Sweeney, and Sundwall on the Liberal line in the November general election. However, state records from August 27, 2006 show that Guller did not file petitions to run as the Liberal Party candidate.

Guller earlier attempted to challenge Kirsten Gillibrand in the September Democratic primary, but dropped out a day before the filing deadline. In 2004, Guller ran against Sweeney on the independent Centrist Party line.

Independence Party
On July 13, 2006, both Gillibrand and Sweeney filed petitions to be listed on the Independence Party line on the November ballot. The Sweeney campaign challenged the number of valid signatures on the Gillibrand petitions, and ultimately the state Board of Elections ruled she did not have enough valid signatures, and gave the Independence Party line to Sweeney.

General campaign
In mid-August, residents of the 20th Congressional District reported receiving a telephone call that some described as a "push-poll.  The call included extremely negative questions about Gillibrand. When pushed by respondents to identify who was doing the poll, the callers provided a phone number that led to Western Wats, a Utah-based research group that does data collection.  A Western Wats worker told the Albany Times Union that the poll was commissioned by The Tarrance Group, a national Republican polling firm that does a lot of work for the National Republican Congressional Committee.  Sweeney's campaign insisted it had nothing to do with the poll.

Sweeney had visits to his district for fundraising and support by First Lady Laura Bush, Senator John McCain, and former New York City Mayor Rudy Giuliani.

Gillibrand was supported by a visit by former President Bill Clinton in late October, and a visit by Senator Hillary Clinton.

Election
On November 7, 2006 Gillibrand defeated Sweeney 53%-47%.

Gillibrand benefited from gaffes by the Sweeney campaign, including the report of a domestic violence incident between the Congressman and his wife, as well as the statewide landslide victories of Eliot Spitzer and Hillary Clinton in New York's Gubernatorial and Senate race. Both Spitzer and Clinton won all the counties in the 20th district. Gillibrand defeated Sweeney in all the major population centers in the district, including Saratoga Springs, Troy, Rensselaer and Dutchess County. Gillibrand lost only rural and sparsely populated Delaware and Greene Counties to Sweeney.

Polls

Critics have argued that the Siena College poll had significant flaws; if so, Sweeney would still have been ahead of Gillibrand, but not as far.  An August Siena College poll showed rather similar results
.

Results

24th District

Incumbent Sherwood Boehlert (R) announced his retirement after twenty-four years, making this a seat of considerable focus for the Democrats in the followup to the mid-terms. Boehlert is considered a moderate Republican, and the district is considered to be a swing district. George Bush won this district by 53% in the 2004 election, but by only 3,000 votes in the 2000 presidential election. The Republican nominee is moderate state Senator Ray Meier, while the Democratic nominee is Oneida County District Attorney Mike Arcuri. Both are locally popular and proven vote-getters and the race was a toss-up. CQPolitics rating: No Clear Favorite. Cook Political Report rating: Republican Toss-Up. Results: Swings to the Democrats, with Arcuri winning 54% of the vote.

25th District

Incumbent James T. Walsh (R), ran unopposed in 2004 and while the Syracuse-based district hasn't had a Democrat represent it since 1971, John Kerry won the district in 2004 by 2.5%. Thus, Walsh had the unusual distinction of being the only Republican to win unopposed and not have George W. Bush win his district. Democrats were fielding former congressional aide Dan Maffei. An October 15–16 Majority Watch poll had Maffei leading Walsh 51% to 43%. Cook Political Report rating: Likely Republican. Results: Walsh kept the district, winning with 51% of the vote.

26th District

Incumbent Thomas M. Reynolds (R), the National Republican Congressional Committee Chairman, faced a rematch with local industrialist and Marine Veteran Jack Davis. While the district leans substantially Republican, Reynolds was held to 55% of the vote in 2004 by political neophyte Davis, who had used the intervening time to build a political base. He campaigned against Reynolds' support of free trade, which he claimed had cost the district thousands of well-paying jobs. Reynolds is one of the Republican party's premiere fund-raisers, but Davis is independently wealthy, and vowed to spend up to $2 million on his campaign. Reynolds held a small lead in the polls until the Mark Foley scandal broke at the end of September. Reynolds had some knowledge of Foley's e-mails, and his chief of staff, Kirk Fordham, formerly Foley's chief of staff, was more directly involved. A November 3 SurveyUSA poll had Reynolds leading Davis 50% to 46% with 4% undecided.. In the space of just a week CQPolitics changed their rating from Safe Republican, to Leans Republican, and then again to Leans Democratic. Results: Reynolds won a close race with 51% of the vote.

29th District

Freshman incumbent Randy Kuhl (R) was elected with 50% in a three-way race in 2004. He faced a potentially strong challenge from former U.S. Navy officer Eric Massa, a long-time friend of 2004 presidential candidate General Wesley Clark. Massa had been an extremely adept fundraiser. In March, President Bush visited the district, in part as a boost to Kuhl's re-election campaign. An October 26 Majority-Watch poll had Massa leading Kuhl 53% to 42%. . Cook Political Report rating: Lean Republican. CQPolitics rating: Leans Republican.Freshman incumbent Randy Kuhl (R) had been elected to Congress with slightly over 50% of the popular vote in a three-way race in 2004.  In early 2005, former U.S. Naval officer Eric J.J. Massa, a long-time friend of 2004 presidential candidate General Wesley Clark filed to run as the Democratic candidate.   Over the course of the next nine months, Massa overcame numerous challenges in his attempt to become the Democratic nominee, including candidate David Nachbar, who days after his announcement chose to step down due to an improper filing of his papers.  By April 2006, Massa had secured the support of all Democratic county committees and become the presumptive Democratic candidate for the District.

Notable Visits
In March 2006, President George W. Bush visited the district, as a chance to promote his new prescription-drug plan, Medicare Part D.  It was considered more of a public-relations boost for Kuhl's re-election campaign than instructive on the issues.

In September 2006, Vice President Dick Cheney also made a fundraising appearance in support of Congressman Kuhl's re-election campaign.  Massa, in turn, ran a Veterans Fundraiser outside the event in support of the local veterans and VA hospitals.

Massa also had numerous endorsers including Congressman and DCCC Chairman Rahm Emanuel, President Bill Clinton, Senator Hillary Clinton, and frequent visits by former Senator Max Cleland.

Horse Race Metrics
Due to the difficulty and the presumptive win by Republicans, neither the Republicans or Democrats poured money into polling in this District.

From polling results in April 2006 by Massa's pollsters, Cooper and Secrest, the race was touted was a virtual dead-heat (Kuhl over Massa 43% to 41% +/- 4%).  An October 2006 Majority-Watch poll had Massa leading Kuhl 53% to 42%. Cook Political Report rating: Lean Republican. CQPolitics rating: Leans Republican.''

Fundraising metrics showed Kuhl with a significant fundraising advantage (over $500K in his campaign account) over Massa.  Over the course of the campaign, Massa consistently outraised Kuhl, sometimes to the tune of a very slim margin.  As the Foley scandal took hold, Massa and the rest of the Democratic party saw an increase of funds - where Massa raised close to half of his funds in the last five weeks of the campaign - primarily from online donors - spurred on by his online outreach efforts.

Results
On Election night, Congressman Kuhl had garnered 52% of the vote, Massa 48% of the vote.  On Election night, Massa chose to request a recount and an accounting of absentee ballots because 6000 votes separated the two and 10K were left to be counted.  After a week of waiting, the ballots were approximately even and Congressman Kuhl was re-elected.  Massa conceded the election with a telephone call to Congressman Kuhl.

Candidates

Randy Kuhl

A native of the 29th District, Congressman Randy Kuhl has lived in the area all of his life. The son of a doctor and a nurse/teacher, Randy was born in Bath, picked grapes and worked inside the wineries on the shores of Keuka Lake, attended school in Hammondsport, had summer jobs in construction and on several different farms during his college years. He owned and operated a business in Bath, became Steuben County attorney, then successfully ran for the New York State Assembly in 1980, the New York State Senate in 1986, and the U.S. House of Representatives in 2004 where he now serves and represents the people of the 29th District.

Randy Kuhl is a graduate of Hammondsport Central School, and earned a B.S. in Civil Engineering from Union College (1966), and in 1969 received his Juris Doctor from Syracuse University College of Law. He is a communicant of St. James Episcopal Church and has been active in the Hammondsport Rotary Club and BPOE 1547 in Bath. He is a member of the Advisory Committee of the Five Rivers Council of the Boy Scouts of America, the Branchport Rod and Gun Club, and the Executive Committee of the Steuben County Republican Committee. He is President of the Board of Directors of the Reginald Wood Scouting Memorial and an immediate past member of the Board of Directors of the Alliance for Manufacturing and Technology.

Eric Massa

Eric Massa was the Democratic nominee. He attended the U.S. Naval Academy at Annapolis and went on to serve in the Navy for 24 years. He eventually served as aide to former NATO Supreme Allied Commander, General Wesley Clark. Near the end of his Navy career he was diagnosed with Non-Hodgkin lymphoma, a disease he was able to survive. A former Republican, he claims he left his party over the issue of the Iraq War and campaigned in New Hampshire during the campaign of his former-boss, Wesley Clark's, failed presidential bid.

During the campaign, Massa positioned himself as strongly opposed to the Iraq war and unrestricted "free trade," favoring instead "fair trade". Other issues in his platform included expanding farm aid programs, as well as bringing homeland security money to the 29th District.  Massa is also active in Band of Brothers/Veterans for a Secure America whose goal is to help veterans who are running for Congress as Democrats.

Massa continued to blog on progressive sites and planned on launching his own blog, 29th United, but never achieved this goal.

Results: Kuhl won with 52% of the vote.

References

External links 
John Sweeney's Campaign Site
Kirsten Gillibrand's Campaign Site
Morris N. Guller's Campaign Site
Edwin Pell's Campaign Site
NY 20th Congressional Race at Daily Kos
Eric Sundwall's Campaign Site
List of top contributors to Sweeney.
Contributions to Sweeney's campaign, by sector.
Massa's campaign site from Archive.org

New York
2006
United States House of Representatives